Truro and Falmouth is a constituency in Cornwall represented in the House of Commons of the UK Parliament since 2019 by Cherilyn Mackrory of the Conservative Party. It is on the South West Peninsula of England, bordered by both the Celtic Sea to the northwest and English Channel to the south. The seat was held by fellow Conservative Sarah Newton from its 2010 creation until her retirement from politics in 2019.

History
The constituency was created for the 2010 UK general election following a review of parliamentary representation in Cornwall by the Boundary Commission, which increased the number of seats in the county from five to six. It replaces parts of the former Truro and St Austell and Falmouth and Camborne seats.

Political history
The result was a very marginal one in 2010, with the previous results in either predecessor seat also closely fought between the Liberal Democrats and the Conservatives.

In the 2017 general election, the constituency was held by the Conservative candidate, although it experienced a 22.5% surge in the Labour vote (the third-largest in the UK), an 11.4% swing that nearly broke the Conservatives' seven-year hold on the seat. The 37.7% of the vote in the Truro and Falmouth constituency achieved by Labour marked their highest share of the vote in a seat incorporating Truro in 47 years (1970).

Boundaries
The former District of Carrick wards of Arwenack, Boscawen, Boslowick, Carland, Feock and Kea, Kenwyn and Chacewater, Moresk, Mylor, Newlyn and Goonhavern, Penryn, Penwerris, Perranporth, Probus, Roseland, St Agnes, Tregolls, Trehaverne and Gloweth, Trescobeas.

The Truro and Falmouth constituency has the same boundaries as the former district of Carrick, with the exception of the ward of Mount Hawke, which is part of the Camborne and Redruth seat.  The main settlements in the constituency are the city of Truro and the town of Falmouth, after which it is named.  Other settlements include Penryn, Perranporth, St Agnes and St Mawes.

Constituency profile

The constituency has visitor attractions spanning diametrically opposite coasts, including Porthtowan and Perranporth, noted for beaches. Falmouth abounds with restaurants, places to stay, as well as sailing and motor-yacht facilities. However, industries and businesses are not dominated by the arts or leisure and chiefly rely on maritime maintenance, hospitality, tourism, retail, distribution, and agriculture. In November 2012, unemployed people and registered jobseekers were  lower than the national average of 3.8%, at 3.0% of the population based on a statistical compilation by The Guardian.

Members of Parliament

Elections

Elections in the 2010s

See also
List of parliamentary constituencies in Cornwall

Notes

References

Constituencies of the Parliament of the United Kingdom established in 2010
Parliamentary constituencies in Cornwall
Politics of Truro